Thomas James Duncan Campbell (6 April 1922 – 20 October 1989) was a Singaporean college administrator and brigadier-general who served as the Director, General Staff of the Singapore Defence Force between 1968 and 1979.

Early Years

Campbell was born on the 6 April 1922 to Percival Joachim Duncan Campbell and Inez Vivienne Ramage Miles.

Military career 

Campell served in the Singapore Volunteer Corps during the Second World War, and was commissioned into active service in 1950. He was one of the first leaders of the Singapore Army, having held the equidistant command of the Chief of Singapore Volunteer Corps during the late 1950s to 1965 and then as Chief of the People's Defence Force from 1965 to 1970.

Principal of St. Stephen's School 
T.J.D. Campell served as the Principal of Saint Stephen's School, Singapore (a primary school) from 1961 to 1966 and from 1971 to 1973

Personal life 

Campbell retired in 1970 and moved to Australia and lived in Kelmscott in Western Australia.

He was married and has a son and a daughter, son-in-law and three grandchildren at the time he died.

References 

1922 births
1989 deaths
Chiefs of Defence Force (Singapore)
British Malaya military personnel of World War II